Eve Karpf (born 2 August 1947) is a British actress. Among her roles was the voice of Weed for the 2001 Bill and Ben reboot. She was a voice of Dennis' mum, Matilda in the 1996 Dennis the Menace television series,  Mrs. Bird in The Adventures of Paddington Bear and The Voice in Trapped!. Karpf also featured in several audiobooks, among them A Creepy Company who was praised as being "a marvelous performer whose storytelling talents keep the listener spellbound." She is known for being the voice of the Ferrero Rocher commercial line, "Monsieur, with these Rocher, you're really spoiling us."

She has numerous minor roles in video games from various franchises based on other media, including James Bond and Star Wars. Her credits include Minerva McGonagall in the Harry Potter video games, including Philosopher's Stone (released in the US as Sorcerer's Stone), Chamber of Secrets, Prisoner of Azkaban, Order of the Phoenix, Half-Blood Prince and Deathly Hallows – Part 2. She also did the voice over for the role of Monica the mother of St. Augustine in the movie Restless Heart (Ignatius Press), Kristina Boaz in the 2003 video game Tomb Raider: The Angel of Darkness, the cat Alvina in 2011 video game Dark Souls and the elf Fiona in the 2014 video game Dragon Age: Inquisition. She is also represented by Hobson's International until 2009.

References

External links

1947 births
Living people
20th-century British actresses
21st-century British actresses
Actresses from London
Audiobook narrators
British film actresses
British television actresses
British video game actresses
British voice actresses
Place of birth missing (living people)